The Chortkiv offensive (7–28 June 1919), sometimes also referred to as the June Offensive, was a surprise military operation by the Ukrainian Galician Army (UHA) on the newly founded Second Polish Republic Polish-Ukrainian War for Eastern Galicia.

The disputed territory was claimed by the nascent Ukrainian state, the Western Ukrainian People's Republic, which also was disputed by the Ukrainian People's Republic and the recently re-established Poland. The area claimed between these three groups was a mixture of Polish, Ukrainian, Jewish peoples intermixed throughout the area.

The attack was initially successful, with Ukrainian forces successfully taking a vast swathe of territory, however in the end the offensive was repelled by the overwhelming numerical superiority of the Polish forces that pushed the Ukrainians back. Eventually, the interwar future of Galicia was decided at the Allied Council of Foreign Ministers that officially hostilities were ceased, however operations existed all the way to the Zbruch River.

The goals
The goal of the Chortkiv offensive was to push the Polish army back to the Zolota Lypa River in order to improve morale among the Ukrainian army and locals by mobilizing a larger army to push the Poles back past Lviv, Przemysl, Chelm, Lublin, and other claimed territories by the Western Ukrainian Republic.

The offensive
On 8 June the 19,000 strong UHA assaulted the city of Chortkiv, forcing the Poles to retreat to the Holohory–Peremyshliany–Bukachivtsi line. Under the command of Oleksander Hrekov, the Ukrainians came close to Lviv, the main city of the province, which was their greatest success.

The Ukrainian forces also gained victories at Yazlovets (10 June), Buchach (11 June), Pidhaitsi, Nyzhniv and Ternopil (14 June) and Berezhany (21 June).

Polish counterattack
As the UHA suffered from a lack of ammunition, on 28 June a better equipped and much larger Polish force broke through the Ukrainian lines at Janczyn and forced the UHA to retreat to the Zbruch River. Eventually the Ukrainians were forced back toward the Dnipro Valley then controlled by the Ukrainian People's Republic, another nascent Ukrainian state that did not hold the same territorial aspirations as its ethnic neighbor.

Aftermath
Though the UHA initially experienced numerous early victories, the numerical and technical superiority of the Polish forces ended its rule. Thus the predominantly Ukrainian provinces of former Austrian Galicia were forcefully integrated into the Polish Republic.

Notes

References

Chortkiv offensive at the Encyclopedia of Ukraine
 
Kubiyovych, Volodymyr, Kuzelia, Zenon. Entsyklopediya Ukrainoznavstva (Encyclopedia of Ukrainian studies)'', 3 volumes (1994). Kiev.  
Ihor Pidkova (editor), Roman Shust (editor), "Dovidnyk z istorii Ukrainy", 3 Volumes, "(t. 3), Kiev, 1993-1999,  (t. 1),  (t. 2),  (t. 3). Article: Чортківський наступ 1919 

Polish–Ukrainian War
Battles involving Poland
Battles involving Ukraine
Ukrainian Galician Army
Conflicts in 1919
Chortkiv
1919 in Poland
1919 in Ukraine
June 1919 events